The Tattingstone Wonder is a folly at Tattingstone in Suffolk, England.

In 1790 Edward White, the local squire, did not like his view of the cottages from Tattingstone Place. He decided to add a third cottage and finished them to look like a church by adding a fake tower and flint façade. It has become a famous Suffolk landmark.

References
Notes

Sources

Folly buildings in England
Buildings and structures in Suffolk
Grade II* listed buildings in Suffolk
Babergh District